Nelson Davis Porter (November 28, 1863 – February 12, 1961) was mayor of Ottawa, Ontario, Canada from 1915 to 1916.

He was born in Montreal, Canada East in 1863 and came to Ottawa with his family in 1870. He worked as an insurance and real estate agent. During his term as mayor, a water pumping station was set up at Lemieux Island to supply water to the city.

He was also an amateur ice hockey player, and was an original member of the Ottawa Hockey Club. He played in their first competitive game in 1884 at the Montreal Winter Carnival Tournament and is credited with scoring their first goal.

He died in Ottawa in 1961 and was buried in the Beechwood Cemetery.

References 

Chain of Office: Biographical Sketches of the Early Mayors of Ottawa (1847–1948), Dave Mullington

Mayors of Ottawa
1863 births
1961 deaths
Ottawa Senators (original) players
Anglophone Quebec people
Canadian sportsperson-politicians
Ice hockey people from Montreal
Ice hockey people from Ottawa